

Events
 Beginning of the Eastern Zhou Dynasty in China as Zhou Ping Wang becomes the first King of the Dynasty to rule from the new capital of Chengzhou (today Luoyang)

Births

Deaths

References

770s BC